The Vermejo Formation is a geologic formation of Upper Cretaceous age. It outcrops in the Raton Basin of northeastern New Mexico and southern Colorado.

Description
The formation consists of a light gray, soft, friable sandstone and shale, which is carbonaceous in part, and may have coal seams or thin coal beds. The Vermejo Formation is about 375 feet (116m) thick at the type locality which is Vermejo Park in Colfax County, New Mexico.

The Vermejo Formation unconformably overlies the Trinidad Sandstone, and unconformably underlies the Raton Formation.

Economic geology
The Vermejo Formation is an historically important coal-bearing formation. Mining began in 1870 in the rich Raton coal bed near the base of the Vermejo Formation. The bed contained bituminous coals of coking quality. These were being extensively exploited by 1924 but the beds were largely exhausted by 1965.

The formation has also been exploited for coalbed methane.

History of investigation
The Vermejo Formation was originally named by W. T. Lee in 1913 in the American Journal of Science. In 1917, Lee described the formation more completely.

See also 
 Vermejo Park Ranch

References

Cretaceous formations of New Mexico
Geologic formations of Colorado
Upper Cretaceous Series of North America